In computer programming, the Schwartzian transform is a technique used to improve the efficiency of sorting a list of items. This idiom is appropriate for comparison-based sorting when the ordering is actually based on the ordering of a certain property (the key) of the elements, where computing that property is an intensive operation that should be performed a minimal number of times. The Schwartzian transform is notable in that it does not use named temporary arrays.

The Schwartzian transform is a version of a Lisp idiom known as decorate-sort-undecorate, which avoids recomputing the sort keys by temporarily associating them with the input items. By comparison, this idiom assures that each input item's key is calculated exactly once, which may still result in repeating some calculations if the input data contains duplicate items.

The idiom is named after Randal L. Schwartz, who first demonstrated it in Perl shortly after the release of Perl 5 in 1994. The term "Schwartzian transform" applied solely to Perl programming for a number of years, but it has later been adopted by some users of other languages, such as Python, to refer to similar idioms in those languages. However, the algorithm was already in use in other languages (under no specific name) before it was popularized among the Perl community in the form of that particular idiom by Schwartz. The term "Schwartzian transform" indicates a specific idiom, and not the algorithm in general.

For example, to sort the word list ("aaaa","a","aa") according to word length: first build the list (["aaaa",4],["a",1],["aa",2]), then sort it according to the numeric values getting (["a",1],["aa",2],["aaaa",4]), then strip off the numbers and you get ("a","aa","aaaa"). That was the algorithm in general, so it does not count as a transform. To make it a true Schwartzian transform, it would be done in Perl like this:
@sorted = map  { $_->[0] }
          sort { $a->[1] <=> $b->[1] or $a->[0] cmp $b->[0] } # Use numeric comparison, fall back to string sort on original
          map  { [$_, length($_)] }    # Calculate the length of the string
               @unsorted;

The Perl idiom
The general form of the Schwartzian transform is:

@sorted = map  { $_->[0] }
          sort { $a->[1] cmp $b->[1] or $a->[0] cmp $b->[0] }
          map  { [$_, foo($_)] }
               @unsorted;

Here foo($_) represents an expression that takes $_ (each item of the list in turn) and produces the corresponding value that is to be compared in its stead.

Reading from right to left (or from the bottom to the top):
 the original list @unsorted is fed into a map operation that wraps each item into a (reference to an anonymous 2-element) array consisting of itself and the calculated value that will determine its sort order (list of item becomes a list of [item, value]);
 then the list of lists produced by map is fed into sort, which sorts it according to the values previously calculated (list of [item, value] ⇒ sorted list of [item, value]);
 finally, another map operation unwraps the values (from the anonymous array) used for the sorting, producing the items of the original list in the sorted order (sorted list of [item, value] ⇒ sorted list of item).

The use of anonymous arrays ensures that memory will be reclaimed by the Perl garbage collector immediately after the sorting is done.

Efficiency analysis
Without the Schwartzian transform, the sorting in the example above would be written in Perl like this:
@sorted = sort { foo($a) cmp foo($b) } @unsorted;

While it is shorter to code, the naive approach here could be much less efficient if the key function (called  in the example above) is expensive to compute. This is because the code inside the brackets is evaluated each time two elements need to be compared.

However, if the function  is relatively simple, then the extra overhead of the Schwartzian transform may be unwarranted.

Example

For example, to sort a list of files by their modification times, a naive approach might be as follows:

  function naiveCompare(file a, file b) {
      return modificationTime(a) < modificationTime(b)
  }
  
  // Assume that sort(list, comparisonPredicate) sorts the given list using
  // the comparisonPredicate to compare two elements.
  sortedArray := sort(filesArray, naiveCompare)

Using the Schwartzian transform, the modification time is calculated only once per file.

A Schwartzian transform involves the functional idiom described above, which does not use temporary arrays.

The same algorithm can be written procedurally to better illustrate how it works, but this requires using temporary arrays, and is not a Schwartzian transform. The following example pseudo-code implements the algorithm in this way:

  for each file in filesArray
      insert array(file, modificationTime(file)) at end of transformedArray
  
  function simpleCompare(array a, array b) {
      return a[2] < b[2]
  }
  
  transformedArray := sort(transformedArray, simpleCompare)
  
  for each file in transformedArray
      insert file[1] at end of sortedArray

History

The first known online appearance of the Schwartzian transform is a December 16, 1994 posting by Randal Schwartz to a thread in comp.unix.shell Usenet newsgroup, crossposted to comp.lang.perl. (The current version of the Perl Timeline is incorrect and refers to a later date in 1995.) The thread began with a question about how to sort a list of lines by their "last" word:

 adjn:Joshua Ng
 adktk:KaLap Timothy Kwong
 admg:Mahalingam Gobieramanan
 admln:Martha L. Nangalama

Schwartz responded with:

#!/usr/bin/perl
require 5; # New features, new bugs!
print
    map { $_->[0] }
    sort { $a->[1] cmp $b->[1] }
    map { [$_, /(\S+)$/] }
    <>; 

This code produces the result:

 admg:Mahalingam Gobieramanan
 adktk:KaLap Timothy Kwong
 admln:Martha L. Nangalama
 adjn:Joshua Ng

Schwartz noted in the post that he was "Speak[ing] with a lisp in Perl", a reference to the idiom's Lisp origins.

The term "Schwartzian transform" itself was coined by Tom Christiansen in a follow-up reply. Later posts by Christiansen made it clear that he had not intended to name the construct, but merely to refer to it from the original post: his attempt to finally name it "The Black Transform" did not take hold ("Black" here being a pun on "schwar[t]z", which means black in German).

Comparison to other languages
Some other languages provide a convenient interface to the same optimization as the Schwartzian transform:
 In Python 2.4 and above, both the  function and the in-place  method take a  parameter that allows the user to provide a "key function" (like  in the examples above). In Python 3 and above, use of the key function is the only way to specify a custom sort order (the previously supported  parameter that allowed the user to provide a "comparison function" was removed). Before Python 2.4, developers would use the lisp-originated decorate–sort–undecorate (DSU) idiom, usually by wrapping the objects in a (sortkey, object) tuple.
 In Ruby 1.8.6 and above, the  abstract class (which includes s) contains a  method, which allows specifying the "key function" (like  in the examples above) as a code block.
 In D 2 and above, the  function is available. It might require less temporary data and be faster than the Perl idiom or the decorate–sort–undecorate idiom present in Python and Lisp. This is because sorting is done in-place, and only minimal extra data (one array of transformed elements) is created.
 Racket's core sort function accepts a #:key keyword argument with a function that extracts a key, and an additional #:cache-keys? requests that the resulting values are cached during sorting.
{
    array_walk($a, function(&$v, $k) { $v = array($v, $k); });
    asort($a);
    array_walk($a, function(&$v, $_) { $v = $v[0]; });
}
 In Raku, one needs to supply a comparator lambda that only takes 1 argument to perform a Schwartzian transform under the hood: @a.sort( { $^a.Str } ) # or shorter: @a.sort(*.Str) would sort on the string representation using a Schwartzian transform, @a.sort( { $^a.Str cmp $^b.Str } ) would do the same converting the elements to compare just before each comparison.
 In Rust, somewhat confusingly, the  method does *not* perform a Schwartzian transform as it will not allocate additional storage for the key, it will call the key function for each value for each comparison. The  method will compute the keys once per element.

References

External links

 Sorting with the Schwartzian Transform by Randal L. Schwartz
 Mark-Jason Dominus explains the Schwartzian Transform
 http://aspn.activestate.com/ASPN/Cookbook/Python/Recipe/52234
 Python Software Foundation (2005). 1.5.2   I want to do a complicated sort: can you do a Schwartzian Transform in Python?. Retrieved June 22, 2005.
 Memoize Perl module - making expensive functions faster by caching their results.

Sorting algorithms
Articles with example Perl code
Articles with example Racket code
Perl